Bluestone National Park Resort is a holiday park in Pembrokeshire, southwest Wales. The resort falls partly within the boundaries of the  Pembrokeshire Coast National Park. The park is owned by several private backers and Pembrokeshire County Council and employs about 700 people.

Description
This area includes the Blue Lagoon indoor water park (not to be confused with the nearby Blue Lagoon former quarry of Abereiddy), Steep Ravine outdoor activity area, an indoor playground and a medieval themed activity area. The resort itself is centred on the "village" which has shops, restaurants, a pub, wine store and a spa.

Within the boundaries of the resort are a ruined manor house (known locally as Castell Coch) and the external structure of Newton North parish church.

The park is car-free (except on check-in and check-out days), but walking and cycling is encouraged. Electric golf buggies can be rented by day or for a full stay and are commonly seen around the park. A number of play areas and food outlets are housed in the Serendome. 

The park has been described as resembling a top-end housing estate.

The park is close to Oakwood Theme Park.

History
In 2016 Bluestone announced plans to spend £2.5 million restoring Blackpool Mill site with the addition of a miniature railway as a tourist attraction, but following objections from the National Park, the plans were deferred by Bluestone, and subsequently rejected, with Bluestone invited to re-apply.

Bluestone subsequently reapplied for change of use and it was granted as well as planning permission for 80 additional lodges

References

External links
Bluestone (official site)
VisitWales information

Villages in Pembrokeshire
Tourist attractions in Pembrokeshire